The 29th AVN Awards ceremony, presented by Adult Video News, honored the best pornographic movies and adult entertainment products of 2011 of the United States and took place January 21, 2012, at a new venue, The Joint inside the Hard Rock Hotel and Casino in Paradise, Nevada. Movies or products released between Oct. 1, 2010 and Sept. 30, 2011 were eligible. The ceremony was televised in the United States by Showtime. Comedian Dave Attell hosted the show for the second time. He first presided over the 27th ceremony held in 2010, and shared the 29th ceremony with co-hosts Bree Olson and Sunny Leone. The awards show was held together with the Adult Entertainment Expo and Internext at the same venue.

On January 11, 2012, AVN announced in a press release that for the first time the AVN Awards ceremony would climax with "the presentation of an all-encompassing grand accolade," Movie of the Year. "Even since the beginning, when we presented separate awards for Best Film and Best Video Feature, there's been no definitive AVN Award equivalent to Best Picture. Now we have one," said AVN senior editor Peter Warren. Rather than nominees, contenders would be chosen from the winners in the categories of: Best All-Sex Release, Best All-Sex Release – Mixed Format, Best All-Girl Release, Best Gonzo Release, Best Vignette Release, Best Comedy, Best Feature, Best Foreign Feature, Best Parody – Comedy and Best Parody – Drama. Voting for Movie of the Year would be conducted just prior to the January 21 ceremony, in a secret meeting of core members of the AVN Awards committee, to ensure winners of the 10 categories remain secret until their presentation. The event would also unveiled a new annual award, the Visionary Award, "created to recognize and honor a leader in adult entertainment who has propelled innovation and taken his company—and the business as a whole—to new heights."

The Rocki Whore Picture Show: A Hardcore Parody and Asa Akira Is Insatiable 2 won the most awards, nine and seven respectively, but the Movie of the Year award went to Portrait of a Call Girl. Portrait also won for Best Feature, Best Actress for Jessie Andrews and Best Director — Feature for Graham Travis. Rocki Whore won Best Director—Parody for Brad Armstrong, Best Screenplay—Parody for Armstrong and Hank Shenanigan and Best Parody — Comedy, among others. Insatiable 2 won Best All-Sex Release, Best Director — Non Feature for Mason and several best sex scene awards for Asa Akira and her co-stars. Individually, Akira won or shared six awards, but the coveted Female Performer of the Year and Best New Starlet awards went to Bobbi Starr and Brooklyn Lee respectively. Lee took home five awards on the night and four went to Starr. Manuel Ferrara won his fourth Male Performer of the Year award, more than anyone else in the event's 29-year history.

Winners and nominees 

The nominees for the 29th AVN Awards were announced on Dec. 6, 2011 in a press release. Those nominees were Gary Kirker from Las Cruces, New Mexico. The film receiving the most nominations was The Rocki Whore Picture Show: A Hardcore Parody with 18, while performer/director Bobbi Starr had the most individual nominations with 16. The winners were announced during the awards ceremony on January 21, 2012.

Major Awards 
The first AVN Movie of the Year Award went to Portrait of a Call Girl, which qualified for consideration by winning Best Feature. The other movies in the running were: Asa Akira Is Insatiable 2 (Best All-Sex Release), Bobbi’s World (Best All-Sex Release – Mixed Format), Cherry 2 (Best All-Girl Release), Dangerous Curves (Best Gonzo Release), Prison Girls (Best Vignette Release), Grindhouse XXX (Best Comedy), Mission Asspossible (Best Foreign Feature), The Rocki Whore Picture Show: A Hardcore Parody (Best Parody – Comedy) and Spider-Man XXX: A Porn Parody (Best Parody – Drama).

Additional major awards are listed below with winner first and highlighted in boldface followed by the rest of the nominees.

{| class=wikitable
|-
! style="background:#89cff0; width:50%" | Male Performer of the Year
! style="background:#89cff0; width:50%" | Female Performer of the Year
|-
| valign="top" |
 Manuel Ferrara
 Mick Blue
 Tom Byron
 James Deen
 Erik Everhard
 Tommy Gunn
 Keiran Lee
 Ramón Nomar
 Mr. Pete
 Anthony Rosano
 Lexington Steele
 Evan Stone
 Nacho Vidal
 Prince Yahshua
| valign="top" |
 Bobbi Starr
 Asa Akira
 Lexi Belle
 Dana DeArmond
 Gracie Glam
 Allie Haze
 Jesse Jane
 Kagney Linn Karter
 Kimberly Kane
 Kayden Kross
 Lily Labeau
 Phoenix Marie
 Chanel Preston
 Kristina Rose
 Andy San Dimas
 Alexis Texas
|-
! style="background:#89cff0" | Best Male Newcomer
! style="background:#89cff0" | Best New Starlet
|-
| valign="top" |
 Xander Corvus
 Giovanni Francesco
 Ryan McLane
 Brendon Miller
 Richie
| valign="top" |
 Brooklyn Lee
 Abella Anderson
 Aiden Ashley
 Jessie Andrews
 Lily Carter
 Skin Diamond
 Ash Hollywood
 Jynx Maze
 Holly Michaels
 Selena Rose
 Samantha Saint
 Lexi Swallow
 Lizz Tayler
 Zoe Voss
|-
! style="background:#89cff0" | Best Actor
! style="background:#89cff0" | Best Actress
|-
| valign="top" |
 Dale DaBone - Elvis XXX: A Porn Parody
 James Bartholet - Saw: A Hardcore Parody
 Barrett Blade - Killer Bodies
 Tom Byron - Runaway
 Xander Corvus - Lost and Found
 Ryan Driller - Superman XXX: A Porn Parody
 Ben English - Official The Silence of the Lambs Parody
 Seth Gamble - Saturday Night Fever XXX: An Exquisite Films Parody
 Jack Lawrence - Anchorman: A XXX Parody
 Ryan McLane - Official Psycho Parody
 Tommy Pistol - Taxi Driver: A XXX Parody
 Anthony Rosano - Rocky XXX: A Parody Thriller!
 Randy Spears - The Orgasm
 Evan Stone - This Ain’t Ghostbusters XXX 3D
 Mac Turner - The Rocki Whore Picture Show: A Hardcore Parody
| valign="top" |
 Jessie Andrews - Portrait of a Call Girl
 Capri Anderson - Runaway
 Tori Black - Killer Bodies
 Jessica Drake - Horizon
 Allie Haze - Lost and Found
 Helly Mae Hellfire - This Ain't Lady Gaga XXX
 Kagney Linn Karter - Official The Silence of the Lambs Parody
 Kayden Kross - Love & Marriage
 Lily Labeau - The Incredible Hulk XXX: A Porn Parody
 Natasha Nice - Dear Abby
 Savanna Samson - Savanna Samson Is the Masseuse
 Andy San Dimas - Rezervoir Doggs: An Exquisite Films Parody
 Hillary Scott - The Flintstones: A XXX Parody
 Bobbi Starr - A Little Part of Me
 Misty Stone - Hustler's Untrue Hollywood Stories: Oprah
|-
! style="background:#89cff0" | Best Supporting Actor
! style="background:#89cff0" | Best Supporting Actress
|-
| valign="top" |
 Xander Corvus - Star Trek: The Next Generation - A XXX Parody
 Chad Alva - Lost and Found
 Lee Bang - Star Trek: The Next Generation - A XXX Parody
 Otto Bauer - Beverly Hillbillies: A XXX Parody
 Dick Delaware - Spider-Man XXX: A Porn Parody
 Tommy Gunn - Fighters
 Steve Holmes - Savanna Samson Is the Masseuse
 Alec Knight - Elvis XXX: A Porn Parody
 Mr. Marcus - Rocky XXX: A Parody Thriller!
 Rocco Reed - Horizon
 Anthony Rosano - The Flintstones: A XXX Parody
 Randy Spears - The Rocki Whore Picture Show: A Hardcore Parody
 Eric Swiss - Pervert
 Michael Vegas - Dear Abby
 Mark Wood - Official The Silence of the Lambs Parody
| valign="top" |
 Jesse Jane - Fighters
 Brooke Lee Adams - The Flintstones: A XXX Parody
 Alektra Blue - The Rocki Whore Picture Show: A Hardcore Parody
 Dana DeArmond - Beverly Hillbillies: A XXX Parody,
 Kimberly Kane - Horizon
 Kagney Linn Karter - Beverly Hillbillies: A XXX Parody
 Kayden Kross - Fighters
 Lily Labeau - Pervert
 Brooklyn Lee - Spider-Man XXX: A Porn Parody
 Chanel Preston - Rezervoir Doggs: An Exquisite Films Parody
 Ann Marie Rios - Escaladies
 Samantha Ryan - Pervert
 Bobbi Starr - Scooby Doo: A XXX Parody
 India Summer - Eternal
 Sarah Vandella - Official Psycho Parody
|-
! style="background:#89cff0" | Unsung Male Performer of the Year
! style="background:#89cff0" | Unsung Starlet of the Year
|-
| valign="top" |
 Johnny Castle
 Alex Gonz
 Chris Johnson
 L.T.
 Ralph Long
 Scott Lyons
 Ryan Madison
 Jack Napier
 Barry Scott
 Johnny Sins
 Kris Slater
 Brian Street Team
 Rico Strong
 Tim Von Swine
| valign="top" |
 Bridgette B.
 Aubrey Addams
 Yurizan Beltran
 Capri Cavanni
 Vicki Chase
 Sophie Dee
 Jacky Joy
 Victoria Lawson
 Jessie Lee
 Karlie Montana
 Mason Moore
 Rachel Roxxx
 Nikki Sexx
 Angel Vain
 Angelina Valentine
|-
! style="background:#89cff0" | Director of the Year
! style="background:#89cff0" | Best Director - Foreign Feature
|-
| valign="top" |
 Axel Braun
 Mike Adriano
 Joanna Angel
 Brad Armstrong
 Rob Black
 Robby D.
 William H.
 Jules Jordan
 Mason
 Lee Roy Myers
 Gary Orona
 Eddie Powell
 Jim Powers
 Mike Quasar
 Will Ryder
| valign="top" |
  - Mission Asspossible
 Jules Bart - All Star POV
 Max Bellochio - Bangkok Connection
 Hervé Bodilis - Mademoiselle de Paris
  Max Candy - My First Orgy
 Paul Chaplin -  'Ello 'Ello!: Lust in France
 Christoph Clark - Angel Perverse 18
 Ted D. - Chloe's Column: Fuck Fame
 Justin Ribeiro & Dos Santos - Private Thoughts
 Gazzman - Whore House
 Timo Hardy - In Like Timo
 Jinashi - Tokyo Escalate Angels
 Kendo - Ink
 Peter Turner - Perfect Angels
|-
! style="background:#89cff0" | Best Feature
! style="background:#89cff0" | Best Foreign Feature
|-
| valign="top" |
 Portrait of a Call Girl
 Assassins
 Booty Shop
 Dear Abby
 Eternal
 Fighters
 Horizon
 Killer Bodies
 A Little Part of Me
 Lost and Found
 My Little Black Book
 Pervert
 Runaway
 Savanna Samson Is the Masseuse
 Teacher's Pet
| valign="top" |
 Mission Asspossible
 Bangkok Connection
 Chloe’s Column: Fuck Fame
 Mademoiselle de Paris
 Rich Little Bitch
 Smuggling Sex-Pedition
|-
! style="background:#89cff0" | Best Parody - Comedy
! style="background:#89cff0" | Best Parody - Drama
|-
| valign="top" |
 The Rocki Whore Picture Show: A Hardcore Parody
 American Dad! XXX: An Exquisite Films Parody
 Anchorman: A XXX Parody, New Sensations
 Beverly Hillbillies: A XXX Parody
 Brazzers Presents: The Parodies
 Bridesmaids XXX Porn Parody
 Can't Be Sanford & Son
 Elvis XXX: A Porn Parody
 The Flintstones: A XXX Parody
 Home Improvement XXX: A Parody
 The Justice League of Pornstar Heroes
 Official The Silence of the Lambs Parody
 Saw: A Hardcore Parody
 Scream XXX: A Porn Parody
 This Ain’t Ghostbusters XXX 3D
| valign="top" |
 Spider-Man XXX: A Porn Parody
 The Blair Witch Project: A Hardcore Parody
 Captain America: An Extreme Comixxx Parody
 Halloween XXX Porn Parody
 Katwoman XXX
 Official Basic Instinct Parody
 Official Psycho Parody
 Rezervoir Doggs: An Exquisite Films Parody
 Rocky XXX: A Parody Thriller!
 Saturday Night Fever: An Exquisite Films Parody
 Star Trek: The Next Generation - A XXX Parody
 Superman XXX: A Porn Parody
 Taxi Driver: A XXX Parody
 This Ain't Dracula XXX 3D
 Top Guns
|-
! style="background:#89cff0" | Best Comedy
! style="background:#89cff0" | Best 3D Release
|-
| valign="top" |
 Grindhouse XXX
 About Jessica
 Babysitters 2
 Big Ass Handy Women
 Blind Date
 The Flying Pink Pig
 Kung Fu Pussy
 The Masseuse 2
 Nerdsworld
 The Orgasm
 Party Girls
 The Red Panties
 Stripper Diaries 2
 Stripper Grams
 XXX Avengers
| valign="top" |
 This Ain't Ghostbusters XXX 3D
 3D Real Pornstars of Chatsworth
 Killer Kurves 3-D
 This Ain't Conan the Barbarian XXX 3D
 This Ain't Dracula XXX 3D
|-
! style="background:#89cff0" | Best Gonzo Release
! style="background:#89cff0" | Best Vignette Release
|-
| valign="top" |
 Dangerous Curves
 Beach Patrol 2
 Heat on the Street: Sex in Public
 Innocent Until Proven Filthy 9
 Jerkoff Material 6
 Joanna Angel and James Deen’s Summer Vacation
 Man vs. Pussy
 Raw 8
 Rocco's American Adventures
 S.O.S.: Sex on the Streets
 Sex Appeal
 Shane's World 42: Paradise Island
 Shut Up and Fuck
 Street Vendors 4
 The Voyeur 37
| valign="top" |
 Prison Girls
 All About Kagney Linn Karter
 Anarchy
 Creature Feature
 I Can't Believe I Fucked a Zombie
 Jesse Jane: Reckless
 Lust Bite
 My Favorite Emo Sluts
 Naughty Nanny 3
 Pornstars Punishment 2
 Rough Sex 3: Adrianna’s Dangerous Mind
 Scurvy Girls 3
 Secretary’s Day 5
 Sexy
 Working Girls
|-
! style="background:#89cff0" | Best All-Sex Release
! style="background:#89cff0" | Best All-Sex Release, Mixed Format
|-
| valign="top" |
 Asa Akira Is Insatiable 2
 Alexis Texas: Nymphomaniac
 The Bombshells
 Grace Glam: Lust
 Harder
 Hard Bodies
 Just Jenna 2
 Kagney Linn Karter Is Relentless
 L for London
 Oil Overload 4
 Performers of the Year 2011
 Sex Dolls
 Sweet Pussy
 Teagan Presley: The Six
 This Is Why I'm Hot
| valign="top" |
 Bobbi's World
 Bad Girls 5
 Black & Blue
 Cum Glazed 2
 Downtown Girls 3
 Kayden Unbound
 Nacho Invades America
 Nacho Vidal vs. Live Gonzo
 No Panties Allowed 2
 Slutty and Sluttier 13
 The Victoria Rae Black Experiment
 What the Fuck! Big Tits, Bitches & Ass
|-
! style="background:#89cff0" | Best Interracial Release
! style="background:#89cff0" | Best All-Girl Release
|-
| valign="top" |
 Lex the Impaler 6
 Black in My Ass
 Black Shack 2
 Diesel Dongs 14
 Heavy Metal 9
 Housewives Gone Black 12
 Interracial Fuck Sluts 2
 Kimberly Kane’s Been Blackmaled
 Lex the Impaler 7
 Monsters of Cock 29
 My Black Fantasy
 Once You Go Black You Never Go Back 6
 Racially Motivated 3
 Rico the Destroyer 3
 White Mommas 3
| valign="top" |
 Cherry 2
 Art School Dykes
 Bree & Tori
 Budapest 3
 Cannibal Queen
 Celeste
 Dirty Panties
 Girl Crush 2
 Girlfriends 3
 The Interns 2
 Lesbian Ass Worship
 Club 59
 Molly's Life 8
 Pretty in Pink
 Taxi 2
|-
! style="background:#89cff0" | Best Anal Release
! style="background:#89cff0" | Best Celebrity Sex Tape
|-
| valign="top" |
 Ass Worship 13
 Anal Attack 3
 Anal Buffet 6
 Anal Delights
 Anal Fanatic 2
 Anal Inferno
 Anal Only
 Anal Workout
 Big Wet Asses 19
 Big Wet Butts 4
 Deep Anal Drilling 2
 Evil Anal 13
 Gape Me
 Joanna Angel: Ass-Fucked
 Lord of Asses 15
| valign="top" |
 Backdoor to Chyna
 Amy Fisher Is Sex
 Brittney Jones Confidential
 Erica Lynne Is Badd: The XXX Home Movies
 Jasmine Waltz: Hollywood It Girl
 Karissa Shannon Superstar
 Phil Varone's Secret Stash
 Tila Tequila Uncorked
|-
! style="background:#89cff0" | Best Anal Sex Scene
! style="background:#89cff0" | Best Oral Sex Scene
|-
| valign="top" |
 Asa Akira, Nacho Vidal - Asa Akira Is Insatiable 2
 Joanna Angel, Manuel Ferrara - Joanna Angel: Ass-Fucked
 Dana DeArmond, Tommy Pistol - Shut Up and Fuck
 Kelly Divine, Nacho Vidal - Kelly Divine Is Buttwoman
 Gracie Glam, Manuel Ferrara - Gracie Glam: Lust
 Jenna Haze, Scott Nails - Just Jenna 2
 Kagney Linn Karter, Manuel Ferrara - All About Kagney Linn Karter
 Brooklyn Lee, Xander Corvus - Spider-Man XXX: A Porn Parody
 Phoenix Marie, Prince Yahshua - Dynamic Booty 6
 Jynx Maze, Toni Ribas - Slutty and Sluttier 13
 Adrianna Nicole, Ramón Nomar - Rough Sex 3: Adrianna’s Dangerous Mind
 Bree Olson, Lexington Steele - Lex the Impaler 6
 Kristina Rose, Nacho Vidal - Nacho Invades America
 Bobbi Starr, Nacho Vidal - 'Shut Up and Fuck Alexis Texas, Mr. Pete - Deep Anal Drilling 3| valign="top" |
 Brooklyn Lee, Juelz Ventura - American Cocksucking Sluts
 Asa Akira - Asian Fuck Faces Capri Anderson - Spider-Man XXX: A Porn Parody Jessie Andrews - Portrait of a Call Girl Charley Chase - Let Me Suck You 2 Dana DeArmond - Praise the Load 6 Skin Diamond, Asa Akira - Orgasmic Oralists Gracie Glam - Massive Facials 3 Jayden Jaymes - Massive Facials 3 Kagney Linn Karter, Breanne Benson, Allie Haze - American Cocksucking Sluts London Keyes - L for London Chanel Preston - The Justice League of Pornstar Heroes Kristina Rose - Let Me Suck You Bobbi Starr - Jessica Drake's Guide to Wicked Sex: Fellatio Jennifer White - Sloppy Head 3|-
! style="background:#89cff0" | Best Boy/Girl Scene
! style="background:#89cff0" | Best Sex Scene in a Foreign-Shot Production
|-
| valign="top" |
 Manuel Ferrara, Lexi Belle - The Bombshells 3
 Mike Adriano, Andy San Dimas - Cum for Me Bill Bailey, Misty Stone - Taxi Driver: A XXX Parody Mick Blue, Kagney Linn Karter - Breast in Class 2: Counterfeit Racks Mick Blue, Stoya - Top Guns Xander Corvus, Allie Haze - Lost and Found James Deen, April O’Neil - Legs Up Hose Down Manuel Ferrara, Jessie Andrews - Portrait of a Call Girl Manuel Ferrara, Katie St. Ives - Party Girls Seth Gamble, Hayden Winters - The Flintstones: A XXX Parody Scott Nails, Jesse Jane - Fighters Derrick Pierce, Lily Labeau - Pervert Toni Ribas, Tanner Mayes - Slutty and Sluttier 13 Nacho Vidal, Gracie Glam - Gracie Glam: Lust Prince Yahshua, Kimberly Kane - Kimberly Kane’s Been Blackmaled| valign="top" |
 Brooklyn Lee, Ian Scott - Mission Asspossible
 Megan Coxxx, James Deen - Dirty Little Club Sluts Angel Dark, Leny Ewil - All Star Teens 2 Cindy Dollar, Ian Scott, Alex Forte, James Brossman - French Maid Service Trainees Niky Gold, J. J., Neeo - Smuggling Sex-Pedition Shelia Grant, Nicole Sweet, Kelly Rose - She Made Me Cum Izabella, Frank Gun, Lauro Giotto, Nick Lang - Tamed Teens 9 Lillian, Ellen Lotus, Amelie, Timo Hardy - In Like Timo Louise, Naomi, Bessy, Barbie White, Candy Sweet, Sandra Rodriguez, Kylie, Rocco Siffredi - Rocco’s Dirty Teens Kristi Lust, Ben Kelly, J. J., John Strong, Peter Oh Toole - Whore House Aletta Ocean, Brandy Smile - Hold Me Close Olga, Jana, Omar Galanti - Omar's Butt Obsession Tallulah, Pascal White - Ink Debbie White, Ian Scott, Mike Angelo - Angel Perverse 17|-
! style="background:#89cff0" | Best Three-Way Sex Scene, Girl/Girl/Boy
! style="background:#89cff0" | Best Girl-Girl Sex Scene
|-
| valign="top" |
 Kristina Rose, Jada Stevens, Nacho Vidal - Ass Worship 13
 Tori Black, Isis Love, Jon Jon - Black Shack 2 Amy Brooke, Gracie Glam, Nacho Vidal - Nacho Vidal vs. Live Gonzo Lily Carter, Skin Diamond, Chris Strokes - Slut Puppies 5 Jenna Haze, Zoe Voss, Scott Nails - Legs Up Hose Down Ash Hollywood, Capri Anderson, Seth Dickens - Spider-Man XXX: A Porn Parody Jesse Jane, Bibi Jones, Manuel Ferrara - Assassins Lily Labeau, Sarah Shevon, Otto Bauer - Pervert Ashli Orion, Charley Chase, Evan Stone - Captain America: An Extreme Comixxx Parody Jenna Presley, Jayden Jaymes, Manuel Ferrara - Party Girls Chanel Preston, Aurora Snow, Tom Byron - Taxi Driver: A XXX Parody Melanie Rios, Gigi Rivera, Toni Ribas - Oil Overload 4 Sheena Ryder, Katie Jordin, Rocco Reed - What the Fuck! Big Tits, Bitches & Ass Bobbi Starr, Tori Lux, Mark Wood - Bobbi's World Alexis Texas, Jenny Hendrix, Rocco Siffredi - Rocco's American Adventures| valign="top" |
 Dana DeArmond, Belladonna - Belladonna: Sexual Explorer
 Jenna Haze, Jelena Jensen - Breast in Class: Naturally Gifted Celeste Star, Kristina Rose - Celeste Jiz Lee, Andy San Dimas - Cherry 2 Ann Marie Rios, Alexis Texas - Dirty Panties Brooke Lee Adams, Hillary Scott - The Flintstones: A XXX Parody Zoe Voss, Samantha Ryan - Girls Kissing Girls 8, Sweetheart Tori Black, Teagan Presley - Killer Bodies Prinzzess, India Summer - Lesbian Sex Riley Jensen, Melanie Rios - Lush Gracie Glam, Lexi Belle - Pretty in Pink Lily Labeau, Bobbi Starr - Prison Girls Sunny Leone, Daisy Marie - RolePlay Justine Joli, Syd Blakovich - Taxi|-
! style="background:#89cff0" | Crossover Star of the Year
! style="background:#89cff0" | Best Porn Star Website
|-
| valign="top" |
 Ron Jeremy
 Brittany Andrews
 Capri Anderson
 Lisa Ann
 Nikki Benz
 Ashley Blue
 Dave Cummings
 Porno Dan
 Allie Haze
 Jesse Jane
 
 Kayden Kross
 Yasmin Lee
 Sunny Leone
 Bree Olson
 Andy San Dimas
 Angie Savage
| valign="top" |
 Bobbi Starr (BobbiStarr.com)
 Asa Akira (AsaAkira.com)
 Bree Olson (BreeOlson.com)
 Dylan Ryder (DylanRyder.com)
 Jelena Jensen (JelenaJensen.com)
 Jesse Jane (JesseJane.com)
 Jessica Jaymes (JessicaJaymesXXX.com)
 Kagney Linn Karter (KagneyLinnKarter.com)
 Kayden Kross (ClubKayden.com)
 Kelly Madison (KellyMadison.com)
 Lisa Ann (TheLisaAnn.com)
  (MariahXXX.net)
 Nina Hartley (Nina.com)
 Sophie Dee (ClubSophieDee.com)
 Sunny Leone (SunnyLeone.com)
 Tanya Tate (TanyaTate.com)
|-
! style="background:#89cff0" | Top Renting and Selling Release
! style="background:#89cff0" | Fan Favorites
|-
| valign="top" |
 Top Guns| valign="top" |
Best Body:
 Riley Steele
Favorite Porn Star:
 Riley Steele
Hottest Sex Scene:
 Riley Steele and Babysitters 2 co-stars Bibi Jones, Jesse Jane, Kayden Kross, Stoya, Manuel Ferrara
Twitter Queen:
 Riley Steele
|}

 Additional Award Winners 
Best Classic Release appeared on the 2012 list of categories that nominations were to be accepted for, however, no nominees or winner were announced for that category.

DVD Categories
 Best All-Girl Series: Women Seeking Women Best All-Sex/Vignette Series: The Bombshells Best Amateur Release: Dare Dorm 4 Best Amateur Series: The Dancing Bear Best Anal Series: Evil Anal Best Animated Release: Alice in Wonderland: A XXX Animation Parody Best BDSM Release: Disciplined Best Big Bust Release: Big Wet Tits 10 Best Big Bust Series: Big Tits in Uniform Best Big Butt Release: Kelly Divine Is Buttwoman Best Big Butt Series: Phat Bottom Girls Best DVD Extras: The Rocki Whore Picture Show: A Hardcore Parody, Wicked Pictures
 Best Educational Release: Jessica Drake's Guide to Wicked Sex: Fellatio Best Ethnic-Themed Release – Asian: Asian Booty 2 Best Ethnic-Themed Release – Black: Big Wet Black Tits 3 Best Ethnic-Themed Release – Latin: Escaladies Best Ethnic-Themed Series: Big Ass Brazilian Butts Best Fem-Dom Strap-On Release: Beggin’ for a Peggin’  Best Foot/Leg Fetish Release: Nylons 8 Best Foreign All-Sex Release: Ink Best Foreign All-Sex Series: Young Harlots Best Gonzo Series: Raw Best Internal Release: Internal Damnation 4 Best Interracial Series: Lex the Impaler Best MILF Release: Seasoned Players 16 Best MILF Series: Seasoned Players Best New Line: Extreme Comixxx Best New Series: The Bombshells Best Older Woman/Younger Girl Release: Mother-Daughter Exchange Club 17 Best Oral Release: American Cocksucking Sluts Best Oral Series: Face Fucking Inc. Best Orgy/Gangbang Release: Gangbanged Best Overall Marketing Campaign – Company Image: Digital Playground
 Best Overall Marketing Campaign – Individual Project: The Rocki Whore Picture Show: A Hardcore Parody, Wicked Pictures
 Best Packaging – Video: This Ain't Ghostbusters XXX 3D,  Hustler Video
 Best POV Release: Double Vision 3 Best Pro-Am Release: Breakin' 'Em In 14 Best Pro-Am Series: Brand New Faces Best Special Effects: Horizon Best Specialty Release – Other Genre: Bush Best Specialty Series: Buttman's Stretch Class Best Squirting Release: Lesbian Bukkake 17 Best Transsexual Release: The Next She-Male Idol 3 Best Transsexual Series: America's Next Top Tranny Best Young Girl Release: Cuties 2 Best Young Girl Series: She's So Cute Clever Title of the Year: Beggin' for a Peggin' Retail and Distribution Categories
 Best Boutique: Good Vibrations, San Francisco
 Best Retail Chain: Hustler Hollywood
 Best Adult Distributor: IVD/East Coast News

Performer/Creator Categories
 Best Art Direction: The Rocki Whore Picture Show: A Hardcore Parody Best Cinematography: Axel Braun, Eli Cross, Spiderman XXX: A Porn Parody Best Director – Feature: Graham Travis, Portrait of a Call Girl Best Director – Non Feature: Mason, Asa Akira Is Insatiable 2 Best Director – Parody: Brad Armstrong, The Rocki Whore Picture Show: A Hardcore Parody Best Double-Penetration Scene: Asa Akira, Mick Blue & Toni Ribas, Asa Akira Is Insatiable 2 Best Editing: Scott Allen, The Rocki Whore Picture Show: A Hardcore Parody Best Group Sex Scene: Asa Akira, Erik Everhard, Toni Ribas, Danny Mountain, Jon Jon, Broc Adams, Ramón Nomar, John Strong, Asa Akira Is Insatiable 2 Best Makeup: Shelby Stevens, Melissa Makeup, The Rocki Whore Picture Show: A Hardcore Parody Best Music Soundtrack: Elvis XXX: A Porn Parody Best Non-Sex Performance: James Bartholet, The Rocki Whore Picture Show: A Hardcore Parody Best Original Song: “Stuck in Your Crack,” Elvis XXX: A Porn Parody Best POV Sex Scene: Andy San Dimas, Bobbi Starr, Erik Everhard, Double Vision 3 Best Screenplay: Jacky St. James, Dear Abby Best Screenplay – Parody: Brad Armstrong, Hank Shenanigan, The Rocki Whore Picture Show: A Hardcore Parody Best Solo Sex Scene: Asa Akira, Superstar Showdown 2: Asa Akira vs. Kristina Rose Best Tease Performance: Asa Akira, Asa Akira Is Insatiable 2 Best Three-Way Sex Scene, Boy/Boy/Girl: Asa Akira, Mick Blue, Toni Ribas, Asa Akira Is Insatiable 2 Female Foreign Performer of the Year: Aleska Diamond
 Male Foreign Performer of the Year: Rocco Siffredi
 MILF/Cougar Performer of the Year: India Summer
 Most Outrageous Sex Scene: Brooklyn Lee, Juelz Ventura in “Suck My Sack With a Straw,” American Cocksucking Sluts Transsexual Performer of the Year: Bailey Jay

Sex Toys and Pleasure Products
 Best Fetish Product: Crystal Minx Plug With Tail, Crystal Delights
 Best Lingerie or Apparel Company: Baci Lingerie
 Best Overall Sex Toy Line: Bedroom Kandi, OhMiBod
 Best Packaging – Pleasure Products: Big Teaze Toys
 Best Party, Game or Gag Product: Adult Trading Cards, Adult Trading Card Company
 Best Sex Accessory: Eyelash Collection, Baci Lingerie
 Best Sex Toy Company – Large: Fleshlight
 Best Sex Toy Company – Small: Big Teaze Toys
 Best Sex Toy for Couples: We-Vibe II, Standard Innovation
 Best Sex Toy for Men: Blade, Fleshlight
 Best Sex Toy for Women: Intensity, Jopen

Web and Technology Categories
 Best Affiliate Program: FameDollars
 Best Alternative Website: Clips4Sale.com, Clips 4 Sale
 Best Dating Website: Fling.com
 Best Live Chat Website: ImLive.com
 Best Membership Website: Brazzers.com
 Best Photography Website: EarlMiller.com
 Best Retail Website: AdultDVDEmpire.com
 Best Solo Girl Website: Ariel Rebel, ArielRebel.com
 Best Studio Website: Evil Angel, EvilAngelVideo.com
 Best Web Premiere: Pictures at an Exxxhibition, EarlMiller.com

 Honorary AVN Awards 

 Visionary Award 
Vivid Entertainment co-founder Steven Hirsch was presented with a new honor, AVN's first Visionary Award, for bringing adult entertainment into the mainstream.

 Hall of Fame 
AVN Hall of Fame inductees for 2012 were:
 Video Branch: Juli Ashton, Rob Black, David Aaron Clark, Dale DaBone, Erik Everhard, Alexander DeVoe, Jenna Haze, Alisha Klass, Toni Ribas, Silvia Saint, Mark Spiegler, Scott Taylor, Inari Vachs, Stacy Valentine and Nacho Vidal.
 Pleasure Product Branch: Larry Garland of Eldorado Trading Co., Joel Tucker of Stockroom and Nick Orlandino of Pipedream Products.
 Internet Founders Branch: Beth Mansfield of PersianKitty.com, Patrick of TheHun.net and Shap of Twistys.com.

 Multiple nominations and awards 

The following releases received multiple awards:
 9 awards: The Rocki Whore Picture Show: A Hardcore Parody 7 awards: Asa Akira Is Insatiable 2 4 awards: Portrait of a Call Girl 3 awards: American Cocksucking Sluts, Elvis XXX: A Porn Parody and Mission Asspossible 2 awards: Ass Worship 13, Beggin' for a Peggin', Cherry 2, Double Vision 3, Spider-Man XXX: A Porn Parody and This Ain't Ghostbusters XXX 3DThe following releases received the most nominations:
 18 nominations: The Rocki Whore Picture Show: A Hardcore Parody''

The following individuals received multiple awards:
 6 awards: Asa Akira
 5 awards: Brooklyn Lee
 4 awards: Bobbi Starr, Riley Steele
 3 awards: Max Candy Toni Ribas
 2 awards: Axel Braun, Erik Everhard, Juelz Ventura, Manuel Ferrara, Mick Blue, Nacho Vidal, Xander Corvus

The following individuals received the most nominations:
 15 nominations: Mick Blue
 14 nominations: Toni Ribas
 13 nominations: Bobbi Starr, James Deen
 12 nominations: Asa Akira
 11 nominations: Andy San Dimas
 10 nominations: Gracie Glam, Kagney Linn Karter, Manuel Ferrara, Mark Wood, Ramón Nomar, Erik Everhard, Nacho Vidal
 9 nominations: Alexis Texas, Jesse Jane, Brooklyn Lee
 8 nominations: Kristina Rose, Lily LaBeau,  John Strong, Kimberly Kane
 7 nominations: Capri Anderson, Allie Haze, Chanel Preston, Kayden Kross, Anthony Rosano, Tommy Gunn, Xander Corvus
 6 nominations: Dana DeArmond, Jenna Haze, Jessie Andrews, Evan Stone, Tim Von Swine

Presenters and performers 
The following individuals were presenters or performers during the awards ceremony:

Presenters

Trophy girls 

 Brett Rossi
 Nicole Aniston replaced Sabrina Maree, who was originally announced but could not fulfill the obligation

Performers

Ceremony information

Changes to awards categories 
Beginning with the 29th AVN Awards, several new categories were introduced to reflect evolving market trends, including:
 Best Studio Website
 Best Solo Girl Website
 Best All-Sex Release - Mixed Format
 Best Director - Parody and Best Celebrity Sex Tape.

Controversies 
As is often the case with awards shows, those who disagreed with this year's award winners took to forums and blogs to voice their objections, particularly around the selection of Dale DaBone as best actor over Tommy Pistol and the selection of India Summer as MILF/Cougar Performer of the Year.

See also

 AVN Awards
 AVN Award for Male Performer of the Year
 AVN Female Performer of the Year Award
 AVN Award for Male Foreign Performer of the Year
 List of members of the AVN Hall of Fame

Notes

References

External links 

 "AVN Announces the 2012 AVN Award Winners"
 AVN Awards Nominees:
2012 (archived at Wayback Machine, January 2, 2012)
AVN Awards 2012: The Nominees - click near "downloaded as a pdf file by clicking here."
 Adult Video News Awards  at the Internet Movie Database
 

AVN Awards
AVN Awards 29